Isabel Nolan is an Irish contemporary artist who works with sculpture, textile, photographs, and text. Nolan lives and works in Dublin.

Work 

Nolan, according to a review of her work in Frieze Magazine, works similarly to Eva Berendes, Nicholas Byrne and Richard Wright, by using pre-modern pattern-making and craftsmanship to re-investigate the importance of making. Nolan frequently makes reference to the aesthetics of cosmology.  The work is often the result of a slow and deliberate process, matching pattern with en elusive sense of order.  Nolan's work often has its origins in literary works, such as Thomas Hardy's poem The Darkling Thrush that provided the title for The Weakened Eye of Day, a work she conceived for the Irish Museum of Modern Art in 2014. As part of The Weakened Eye of Day, she wrote a piece of "speculative fiction" in the form of an online audio work called The Three Body Problem.

Career 
Her work has been shown in the Irish Museum of Modern Art, the Musée d’art moderne de Saint Etienne, France and Mercer Union. Nolan was one of a group of seven artists who represented Ireland in the 2005 Venice Biennale.

Bibliography 
Nolan, Isabel. Isabel Nolan : intimately unrelated = intimement sans rapport. Sligo Saint Etienne: The Model Musée d'Art Moderne, 2011. ISBN 978-0-9567179-1-7
Nolan, Isabel. Some surfaces on which patterns occur. Onestar Press, 2013.
Nolan, Isabel. Curling up with reality. Dublin: Launchpad and Kerlin Gallery, 2020. ISBN 978-0-9750070-9-3

References

External links 
 The three body problem (audio work)
Kerlin Gallery artist page

1974 births
Living people
Irish women artists
Irish contemporary artists
Artists from Dublin (city)